Kleine Scheidegg is a railway station and hub that is situated on the summit of Kleine Scheidegg, a mountain pass in the Bernese Oberland region of Switzerland. The pass, located between the Lauberhorn and the Eiger's ridge, houses a complex of hotels and railway buildings. Administratively, the station is in the municipality of Lauterbrunnen in the canton of Bern, a few metres from the border with the municipality of Grindelwald.

The station is the culminating point of the Wengernalp Railway (WAB), whose trains operate to Kleine Scheidegg from Lauterbrunnen via Wengen, and separately from Grindelwald. It is also the lower terminus of the Jungfrau Railway (JB), whose trains climb within the Eiger to the Jungfraujoch. All passengers travelling to the Jungfraujoch, or between Lauterbrunnen and Grindelwald, must change trains at the station. At 2,061 metres above sea level, it is the highest railway hub in Switzerland and Europe, and the third highest railway crossing on the continent. The widest section of the station has about 10 parallel tracks.

WAB trains from Lauterbrunnen enter the station at its western end, and from Grindelwald at its eastern end, but no through trains are operated. This is principally because of the need, for safety reasons, to have each train's motorcar or locomotive at its downhill end. The WAB tracks at Kleine Scheidegg includes a, partially underground, wye track to allow trains to be reversed, opposite to the Jungfrau Railway tracks, but this is not used for trains in passenger service.

The WAB and JB use different rail gauges, different electrification systems and different rack railway technology, and are not physically connected. The depot of the JB is located at Kleine Scheidegg, but not the line's workshops. These are located at Eigergletscher station, one stop up the line.

The station is served by the following passenger trains:

See also 
List of highest railway stations in Switzerland

References

External links 
 
 
 Kleine Scheidegg station on the Jungfrau Railway web site

Railway stations in the canton of Bern
Railway stations in Switzerland opened in 1892